In sign languages, expressions are the distinctive body postures and facial expressions that accompany signing, and which are necessary to properly form words. Expression is one of five components of a sign, along with handshape, orientation, location, and movement. A major component of expression is mouthing. However, not all signs have an inherent expression.

References

Sign language